Events in the year 1870 in Paraguay.

Incumbents
President: Francisco Solano López
Vice President: Domingo Francisco Sánchez

Events
March 1 - Battle of Cerro Corá, end of the Paraguayan War

Deaths
March 1 - Francisco Solano López, Domingo Francisco Sánchez, Juan Francisco López (son of Francisco Solano)

 
1870s in Paraguay
Years of the 19th century in Paraguay
Paraguay
Paraguay